The Chiemgau Alps are a mountain range in the Northern Limestone Alps and belong to the Eastern Alps. Their major part is situated in Bavaria, Germany and only a small section crosses the Austrian border into the states of Salzburg and Tirol. They reach their highest elevation  (1961 m) in the Sonntagshorn, a peak straddling the German-Austrian border.

Geography
The Chiemgau Alps stretch from the Inn River in the West to the Salzach River in the East and cover a distance of 60 km in strike direction; their maximum width in North-South direction amounts to about 25–30 km.
They are surrounded by the following mountain ranges:
 Bavarian Prealps in the West
 Kaisergebirge in the Southwest
 Leoganger Steinberge in the South
 Loferer Steinberge in the Southeast
 Berchtesgaden Alps in the Southeast and East
Their northern edge often drops off quite drastically to the foothills.

Major peaks
 Sonntagshorn - 1,961 m
 Steinplatte - 1,869 m
 Geigelstein - 1,808 m
 Zwiesel - 1,781 m
 Dürrnbachhorn - 1,776 m
 Hochstaufen - 1,771 m
 Fellhorn - 1,764 m
 Hochgern - 1,744 m
 Rauschberg - 1,671 m
 Hochries - 1,569 m 
 Ristfeuchthorn - 1,569 m 
 Klausenberg - 1,548 m
 Unternberg - 1,425 m
 Heuberg - 1,338 m

Peaks for rock climbing:
 Hörndlwand 1684 m
 Kampenwand 1664 m

 
Mountain ranges of the Alps
Mountain ranges of Tyrol (state)
Mountain ranges of Bavaria
Mountain ranges of Salzburg (state)
Northern Limestone Alps